The Ministry of Health Act 1919 was an Act of Parliament which established for the first time in the United Kingdom a Minister of Health.

It also established the Consultative Council on National Health Insurance, the Consultative Council on Medical and Allied Services, the Consultative Council on Local Health Administration and the Consultative Council on General Health Questions. Separate provision was made for consultative arrangements in Wales and Ireland.

Christopher Addison was the first minister appointed.

Its role was to 'take all such steps as may be desirable to secure the preparation, effective carrying out and co-ordination of measures conducive to the health of the people'.

References

External links
 Text of the act

United Kingdom Acts of Parliament 1919
Acts of the Parliament of the United Kingdom concerning healthcare